Wicklesgreuth station is a railway station in the Wicklesgreuth district of the municipality of Petersaurach, located in the Ansbach district in Middle Franconia, Germany. The station is located at the junction of the Nuremberg–Crailsheim and Wicklesgreuth–Windsbach lines of Deutsche Bahn.

References

Nuremberg S-Bahn stations
Railway stations in Bavaria
Railway stations in Germany opened in 1875
1875 establishments in Bavaria
Buildings and structures in Ansbach (district)